

55001–55100 

|-id=082
| 55082 Xlendi ||  || Xlendi, Gozo, Malta † || 
|}

55101–55200 

|-id=108
| 55108 Beamueller ||  || Beatrice E. A. Mueller, American astronomer || 
|-id=112
| 55112 Mariangela ||  || Maria Angels Gassol i Avante, wife of the discoverer || 
|-id=196
| 55196 Marchini ||  || Alessandro Marchini, Italian computer scientist, astronomy popularizer, and director of the Astronomical Observatory of the University of Siena || 
|}

55201–55300 

|-id=212
| 55212 Yukitoayatsuji ||  || Yukito Ayatsuji is the pen name of Naoyuki Uchida (born 1960), a Japanese writer of horror and mystery. He is one of the founders of the Honkaku Mystery Writers Club of Japan. He was one of the two winners of the 1992 Mystery Writers of Japan Award. His best-known works are The Decagon House Murders and (manga). || 
|-id=221
| 55221 Nancynoblitt ||  || Nancy Noblitt (born 1951), a friend and loyal supporter of the Rose-Hulman Observatory, in Terre Haute, Indiana, where this asteroid was discovered. || 
|-id=222
| 55222 Makotoshinkai ||  || Makoto Shinkai, born Makoto Niitsu (born 1973), is a Japanese author, manga artist, cinematographer, director and producer. His anime credits include Your Name, Weathering With You, 5 Centimeters Per Second and The Garden of Words ||

|-id=223
| 55223 Akiraifukube ||  || Akira Ifukube (1914–2006) was a Japanese composer of film scores and classical music. He is best known for the music for the 1954 movie Gojira, also known in the West as Godzilla. || 
|-id=276
| 55276 Kenlarner ||  || Ken Larner (born 1938), husband of Nancy (born 1943), an American exploration geophysicist with a distinguished career at Western Geophysical, an international oil exploration company, and the Colorado School of Mines, a public research University, where he directs the Center for Wave Phenomena (Src). || 
|}

55301–55400 

|-id=319
| 55319 Takanashi ||  || Yasuharu Takanashi (born 1963) is a composer of music for video games and anime. Some of the films he has produced scores for include Shiki, Ikki Tousen, Naruto Shippuden, Fairy Tail and Sailor Moon Crystal. || 
|-id=320
| 55320 Busler ||  || William J. Busler (born 1944) has had a long and distinguished career as a researcher and teacher in the field of biochemistry. He has also been a planetarium director and has had a lifelong love for teaching fellow amateur astronomers about the universe. || 
|-id=331
| 55331 Putzi ||  || Antonie ("Putzi") T. Schwartz, American mother, artist and holistic health practitioner || 
|-id=381
| 55381 Lautakwah ||  || Andy Lau (born 1961) is a Hong Kong actor, singer and film producer. Lau was entered into the Guinness World Records for the `Most Awards Won by a Cantopop Male Artist' with a total unprecedented 292 awards won by year 2000. In 1999, he was also awarded the Ten Outstanding Young Persons of the World. || 
|-id=382
| 55382 Kootinlok ||  || Louis Koo (born 1970) is a Hong Kong actor and film producer. He started his career in television and won TVB's Best Actor award in both 1999 and 2001. Koo is one of the most popular and talented actors of the Hong Kong film industry. He is also a low-key donor who had helped build close to 100 schools in China. || 
|-id=383
| 55383 Cheungkwokwing ||  || Leslie Cheung (1956–2003) was a leading Hong Kong singer and actor, with charisma comparable to James Dean. Cheung won the 1991 Hong Kong Film Award for best actor. || 
|-id=384
| 55384 Muiyimfong ||  || Anita Mui (1963–2003) was a Hong Kong singer and actress who made great contributions to the Cantopop music scene and received numerous awards and honors. She remained an idol throughout most of her career, and was generally regarded as a Cantopop diva. || 
|-id=397
| 55397 Hackman ||  || Gene Hackman (born 1930) is an American actor and novelist. He won an Academy Award for Best Actor for the 1971 movie The French Connection and an Academy Award for Best Supporting Actor in the 1992 movie Unforgiven. With Daniel Lenihan, he has written three historical fiction novels and also two solo novels. || 
|}

55401–55500 

|-id=418
| 55418 Bianciardi ||  || Giorgio Bianciardi, researcher at the University of Siena || 
|-id=428
| 55428 Cappellaro ||  || Enrico Cappellaro, Italian chief astronomer of the Istituto Nazionale di Astrofisica (National Institute for Astrophysics) and director of the Osservatorio Astronomico di Padova (Padua Astronomical Observatory) || 
|-id=477
| 55477 Soroban ||  || Soroban, the Japanese abacus †  || 
|}

55501–55600 

|-id=543
| 55543 Nemeghaire ||  || Jean Nemeghaire, Belgian assistant at the Royal Meteorological Institute of Belgium, the discoverer's physics teacher || 
|-id=555
| 55555 DNA ||  || DNA, deoxyribonucleic acid || 
|-id=559
| 55559 Briancraine ||  || Brian L. Craine (born 1951) is molecular biologist, physician and inventor. He has been an active research scientist for over 45 years, and holds multiple patents for medical devices and innovative biotechnology protocols. He has also made significant contributions to the discovery and characterization of variable stars. || 
|-id=561
| 55561 Madenberg ||  || Janet A. Stevens (née Madenberg, born 1950), an American amateur astronomer and discoverer of minor planets who started a loaner telescope program in 1984 to introduce novices to telescopic observing. She co-edited Northern Lights from 1990 to 1998 and was executive secretary of the Astronomical League from 1995 to 2001. She directs the Desert Moon Observatory together with her husband Berton L. Stevens || 
|-id=576
| 55576 Amycus ||  || The centaur Amycus, son of Ophion, who attended Pirithous' wedding, fought against the Lapiths, and was killed by Pelates of Pella || 
|}

55601–55700 

|-id=676
| 55676 Klythios || 3034 T-1 || Klythios (Clytius), one of the Elders of Troy (Iliad, Book III) || 
|-id=678
| 55678 Lampos || 3291 T-1 || Lampos or Lampus, son of Laomedon, one of the Elders of the city of Troy, father of Dolops || 
|}

55701–55800 

|-
| 55701 Ukalegon || 1193 T-3 || Ucalegon, from Greek mythology, one of the Elders of Troy, whose house was set on fire by the Achaeans when they sacked the city || 
|-id=702
| 55702 Thymoitos || 1302 T-3 || Thymoetes (Thymoitos), from Greek mythology, son of Laomedon, one of the Elders of the city of Troy, and the first to urge that the Trojan Horse be brought into the city || 
|-id=720
| 55720 Daandehoop || 1972 RE || Daniël "Daan" de Hoop (born 1945), honorary member and chairman of the Dutch Association for Spaceflight (1995–2005). He made many valuable contributions to the public understanding of spaceflight and space exploration. || 
|-id=733
| 55733 Lepsius ||  || Karl Richard Lepsius (1810–1884), a German egyptologist who studied the monuments, pyramids and mastabas of the Old Kingdom (c. 2686-c. 2160 BC) in Egypt and Sudan. He did much to catalogue archaeological remains and to establish a chronology for Egyptian history. || 
|-id=735
| 55735 Magdeburg || 1987 QV || The German city of Magdeburg, the capital of Saxony-Anhalt. It was first recorded in 805 and is situated on the Elbe river. Magdeburg became important under emperor Otto I, who founded a cathedral there. || 
|-id=737
| 55737 Coquimbo ||  || The Chilean city of Coquimbo, the capital of the Elqui province, located on the Pan American Highway. The natural harbor in Coquimbo was taken over by Pedro de Valdivia in 1550, together with the gold and copper industry in the region. || 
|-id=749
| 55749 Eulenspiegel ||  || Till Eulenspiegel, a folklore character of Middle Low German oral tradition who lived in the fourteenth century in northern Germany. Many odd anecdotes, tricks and jests are connected with him. They became the source of numerous folk and literary tales translated into several languages. || 
|-id=753
| 55753 Raman ||  || C. V. Raman (1888–1970), an Indian physicist who showed the inelastic scattering of photons traversing a material. For his discovery of the so-called Raman scattering he received the 1930 Nobel Prize in physics. The Raman spectroscopy helps to study atomic and complicated molecular structures. || 
|-id=755
| 55755 Blythe ||  || Blythe Andra Lowe, a Canadian geologist and wife of amateur astronomer Andrew Lowe who discovered this minor planet || 
|-id=759
| 55759 Erdmannsdorff ||  || Friedrich Wilhelm von Erdmannsdorff (1736–1800), German architect and representative of the German early Classical style. He built the Wörlitz and Dessau castles of the principality of Anhalt. He also participated in the interior design of Prussian residences in Berlin and Potsdam (Sanssouci). || 
|-id=772
| 55772 Loder ||  || Justus Christian Loder (1753–1832) was one of the most distinguished German anatomists of his time and wrote several textbooks. He founded the first maternity hospital in Jena. He maintained close relations with Goethe. || 
|}

55801–55900 

|-id=810
| 55810 Fabiofazio || 1994 TC || Fabio Fazio (born 1964) an Italian public service broadcaster at RAI who debuted in October 1983. Beginning in 2003 he has been conducting a talk show with scientists, writers and other celebrities. || 
|-id=815
| 55815 Melindakim ||  || Melinda Kim Dowling (née Steel, born 1958), younger sister of Duncan Steel who discovered this minor planet. A businesswoman who lives in Midsomer Norton, Somerset, she has been very supportive of the discoverer's career. || 
|-id=838
| 55838 Hagongda || 1996 LN || The Harbin Institute of Technology, a key national university in China. Founded in 1920, it is prestigious in astronautics and other high-technology fields. This multi-disciplinary excellence has enabled it to make significant contributions in Chinese space programs. || 
|-id=844
| 55844 Bičák ||  || Jiří Bičák (born 1942), a Czech professor of theoretical physics at Charles University in Prague. His expertise includes several topics in classical and quantum theory of general relativity, as well as their applications in astrophysics. The name was suggested by D. Vokrouhlický. || 
|-id=845
| 55845 Marco ||  || Marco Colombini (born 1990), an Economics and Commerce graduate of the University of Modena, is employed at a metalworking company. He is the third son of one of co-discoverers of this minor planet. || 
|-id=854
| 55854 Stoppani ||  || Eugenio Stoppani (1850–1917) who erected a mountain refuge in 1905, which is now the site of the Sormano Astronomical Observatory, in the place where his father Edoardo Stoppani (1818–1892) died accidentally. Antonio Stoppani (1824–1891) (probably a distant relative) was a distinguished paleontologist. || 
|-id=873
| 55873 Shiomidake ||  || Shiomidake, a mountain in northern Shizuoka, Japan, about 3047 meters high. || 
|-id=874
| 55874 Brlka ||  || Petr Brlka (1945–1966), a Czech amateur astronomer, was a member since 1959 and from 1963 the chairman of the Meteor Observers Group in Brno. A student of mathematics and physics in Brno University, he died in an avalanche in the Vysoke Tatry Mountains in Slovakia. || 
|-id=875
| 55875 Hirohatagaoka || 1997 VH || Hirohatagaoka, a hill on which is located Hadano High School, from which the discoverer graduated (img) || 
|-id=892
| 55892 Fuzhougezhi ||  || The Fuzhou Gezhi High School (Ge Zhi means "Science") in China has made outstanding contributions to national education in China during the 160 years since its foundation in 1846. || 
|}

55901–56000 

|-
| 55901 Xuaoao ||  || Xu Aoao (born 1940) is a solar-physics astronomer and educator. As Vice President of Nanjing University and President of the Macau University of Science and Technology, he made significant contributions to promoting the education and research of the universities. || 
|-id=000
| 56000 Mesopotamia ||  || Mesopotamia, cradle of human civilization || 
|}

References 

055001-056000